Woo Joo-Young (Hangul: 우주영; born 18 January 1981) is a retired South Korean football player.

He participated in the 2009 East Asian Games as a member of South Korea.

References

1981 births
Living people
Association football defenders
South Korean footballers
South Korean expatriate footballers
South Korean expatriate sportspeople in China
Expatriate footballers in China
Daejeon Korail FC players
Changsha Ginde players
Yanbian Funde F.C. players
Korea National League players
Chinese Super League players
China League One players